A kalasam is a finial typically placed atop the towers of Hindu temples. These kalasams, in the form of an inverted pot with a point facing the sky, are prominent elements of temple architecture. Periodic renewal of the temple is called samprokshanam or kumbhabishekam (when held as a festival) and focuses on the kalasams. Elaborate rituals are performed along with renewing the temple's physical structures.

Most kalasams are made of metal and some of stone. The view of the gopuram (temple tower) is one of the important rituals of Hindu worship along with view of dwajasthambam or kodimaram (temple flag mast). These gopurams are usually topped with ornamental kalasams.

Some temples have four entrance towers which protect about 75,000 sq meters on all four sides. However, these are approximate numbers.

The kalasams are traditionally filled with grains; this was an old tradition to ensure that in times of floods or disaster, grain could be planted using the stores in the kalasams. Every 12 years, the grain in the temple kalasams is refilled and changed during the festival.

References

Hindu temple architecture